Progress M-33 was a Russian unmanned Progress cargo spacecraft, which was launched in November 1996 to resupply the Mir space station.

Launch
Progress M-33 launched on 19 November 1996 from the Baikonur Cosmodrome in Kazakhstan. It used a Soyuz-U rocket.

Docking
Progress M-33 docked with the aft port of the Kvant-1 module of Mir on 22 November 1996 at 01:01:30 UTC, and was undocked on 6 February 1997 at 12:13:53 UTC. An unsuccessful redocking attempt was made on 4 March 1997 at 07:41 UTC.

Decay
It remained in orbit until 12 March 1997, when it was deorbited. The deorbit burn occurred at 02:35:00 UTC, with the mission ending at 03:23:37 UTC.

See also

 1996 in spaceflight
 List of Progress missions
 List of uncrewed spaceflights to Mir

References

Progress (spacecraft) missions
1996 in Kazakhstan
Spacecraft launched in 1996
Spacecraft which reentered in 1997
Spacecraft launched by Soyuz-U rockets